The Aquinas Institute of Rochester is a co-educational Catholic school in Rochester, New York established in 1902. Although The Aquinas Institute was founded as an all-male high school, it opened to female students in 1982. It is located within City of Rochester. It has stood at its current location on Dewey Avenue since 1925.  Over 18,000 have graduated since the school opening.

Buildings on campus
The main school building is listed on the National Register of Historic Places.

The Wegman - Napier Building, an extension of the main school building, houses science labs for biology and chemistry classes, as well as a renovated gym.  Aquinas' biology labs were refurbished in 2007, and a  field house was built in 2008.

Aquinas constructed an on-campus stadium in 2005, sponsored by and named the Wegmans Sports Complex. The new stadium was built twenty years after its previous football stadium Holleder Memorial Stadium was demolished in 1985.

Notable alumni
 Bud Wiser, American director, producer and screenwriter.

 Robert Agostinelli, right wing activist and co founder of Rhone Group.
 Chris Bostick, professional baseball player
 Dick Buerkle, former world record holder in the Indoor 1 mile
 Robert Duffy, former New York Lieutenant Governor and former mayor and police chief of Rochester, New York
 Brian Gionta, professional hockey player
 David J. Hayes, 2nd and 5th United States Deputy Secretary of the Interior
 Frank Judge, Editor & publisher, poet, translator, educator and arts administrator
 Don Holleder, West Point football star and Vietnam War hero
 Nicholas Kehoe, President of the Congressional Medal of Honor Foundation
 Jamir Jones, Professional Football Player
 Kevin McMahan, professional football player
 Donald Mark, New York Supreme Court Justice
 John Porcari, deputy secretary of transportation
 Thomas Rosica, CSB, Roman Catholic priest and CEO of Salt and Light Catholic Media Foundation
 Robert Wegman, former CEO of Wegmans Food Markets

References

High schools in Monroe County, New York
Catholic secondary schools in New York (state)
School buildings on the National Register of Historic Places in New York (state)
Roman Catholic Diocese of Rochester
Educational institutions established in 1902
Private middle schools in New York (state)
National Register of Historic Places in Rochester, New York
1902 establishments in New York (state)